This is a List of Old Xaverians, they being notable former students—known as "Old Xaverians" (Old Xavs)—and members of the "Old Xaverians' Association" ("OXA") of the Roman Catholic school Xavier College in Kew, Victoria, Australia. Most entries have been sourced to the official announcement of the Old Xaverians' Association "Roll of Men of Achievement" announced at the 71st Annual Old Xaverians' Dinner held at Xavier College on 21 March 1997.

Arts, academia, entertainment and media
 Philip Brady  – TV and radio personality
 Michael Chamberlin – stand up comedian; TV personality
 Santo Cilauro – comedian; cast member of The Panel
 Charlie Clausen – actor and comedian
Colin Colahan – painter and sculptor. An Australian official war artist in 1942
 Timothy Conigrave – author of Holding the Man
 Greg Dening – emeritus professor of history, University of Melbourne; author of the official history of Xavier College and the OXA
 Brian Fitzgerald - Prominent Liturgical Musician and Composer. Choirmaster of St. Patricks Cathedral Melbourne 1973-1986. Brother of Paul.
 Paul Fitzgerald   – world-renowned artist. Founding president of the Realist Artists Guild of Australia. Artist of official portrait of Queen Elizabeth II
 Roger Franklin - Author of "The Defender: The story of General Dynamics", "Inferno: The Day Victoria Burned", "Fev" journalist, Quadrant Online editor
 Ben Gannon   - film, theatre, and TV producer
 Simon Gleeson – theatre actor based in London
 Tom Gleisner – comedian; The Panel cast member 
 Michael Gracey - director of The Greatest Showman
 Gerard Henderson – syndicated newspaper columnist and former adviser to prime minister John Howard
 Gypsy and the Cat – two-piece band: Xavier Bacash and Lionel Towers
 Peter Landy – Seven Network sports commentator
 Lawrence Leung – comedian, star of Lawrence Leung's Choose Your Own Adventure
 Dan Lonergan – ABC radio sports commentator
 Sam McClure - AFL journalist
 James Massola – south-east Asia correspondent, previously chief political correspondent, The Sydney Morning Herald and The Age
 Matthew Newton – actor (Underbelly, Thank God You're Here); Logie nominee
 Jack O'Hagan   – musician and poet. Wrote the songs  "Along The Road To Gundagai" 1922 & "Our Don Bradman" 1930 
 Brian O'Shaughnessy (philosopher) – philosopher based in London
 Peter O'Shaughnessy  – actor, author, folklorist based in the UK
 Boyd Oxlade – author of Death in Brunswick.
 Grant Smillie – one half of TV Rock
 Matt Walters – Australian musician
 Mike Walsh ,  – TV personality, entrepreneur, and philanthropist

Business
 Lt Sir Reginald Robert Barnewall  13th Baronet Barnewall aviator.
 Sir Lewis Burne  President of the Australian Council of Employers' Federations (1957–58).
Edward Connellan ,  Founder of Connair.
 Sir Nathaniel Freeman  (XC 1912) Philanthropist, film distributor and Managing Director of Metro-Goldwyn-Mayer in Australia.
 James P. Gorman  (XC 1970–76)banker, CEO of Morgan Stanley
 James Lavan , Head of Trading at the Commonwealth Bank of Australia   
 Jiro Muramats (XC 1895–97)pearler and storekeeper from Cossack, Western Australia
 Lloyd J. Williamsproperty developer and entrepreneur
 Adam D’Sylva (XC 1995)- Head Chef and owner of TONKA and CODA
 George Taylor Chairman of Bank of London & South America Ltd (1970-1971) which later merged with Lloyds Bank Europe Ltd.
 Paul Connors- Leading AFL player manager
 Lewis Romano - Tech Entrepreneur

Clergy
 Denis HartArchbishop of Melbourne (2001-2018)
 Romuald Denis Hayes SSCBishop of Rockhampton (1932-1945)

Law

High Court of Australia
 Simon Steward , Judge of the High Court of Australia (since 2020)

Supreme Court of Papua New Guinea
 Sir Colman Michael O'Loghlen , (XC 1931) 6th Baronet O'Loghlen  acting Judge of the Supreme Court of Papua New Guinea, inaugural judge of the National Court of Papua New Guinea.

Australian State Supreme Courts
 Sir Kevin Victor Anderson Judge of the Supreme Court of Victoria (1969-1984)
 David Byrne   Judge of the Supreme Court of Victoria (1991-2010), Deputy Chief Justice (2001-2010).
 William Cox ,  (XC 1948–53)Chief Justice of the Supreme Court of Tasmania
 Philip Cummins ,  Judge of the Supreme Court of Victoria (1988-2009), Chairperson of the Victorian Law Reform Commission (2012-2019). 
 Sir Charles Duffy  Judge of the Supreme Court of Victoria (1933-1961)
 Jack Forrest Judge of the Trial Division of the Supreme Court of Victoria (2007-2018)
 Terry Forrest  Judge of the Court of Appeal of the Supreme Court of Victoria (since 2018) 
 Tim Ginnane  Justice of the Supreme Court of Victoria (2013 - present)
 Sir John LavanJudge of the Supreme Court of Western Australia (1969-1981)
 Kevin Lyons  Judge of Trial Division of the Supreme Court of Victoria (since 2018) 
 Sir Murray McInerney Judge of the Supreme Court of Victoria (1965-1983) 
 Richard Niall  Judge of the Supreme Court of Victoria (since 2017) and Solicitor-General of Victoria (2015-2017)
 Norman O'Bryan Judge of the Supreme Court of Victoria (1977-1992)
 Peter Riordan  Judge of Trial Division of the Supreme Court of Victoria (since 2015)  
 Rear Admiral Jack Rush ,   Judge of the Supreme Court of Victoria (2013-2016), Judge Advocate General of the Australian Defence Force (since 2021)
 Simon Whelan  (XC 1967–1971)  Judge of the Supreme Court of Victoria (2004-2020)

Senior courts
 Hubert Frederico  Judge of the Family Court of Australia (1976-2003).
 Geoffrey Giudice  President of the Australian Industrial Relation Commission, Judge of the Federal Court of Australia. President of the Fair Work Commission. 
 Anthony Howard , Judge of the County Court of Victoria (2006-2016). 
 Michael O’Bryan Judge of the Federal Court of Australia (2019- ) 
 Xavier Connor  (1926–34)Judge of the Supreme Court of the Australian Capital Territory; the Federal Court of Australia; Chairman of the Victorian Bar
 John Walters Judge of the Family Court of Australia

King's Counsel

 Christopher J Blanden   Victorian Bar
 Chris Caleo   Victorian Bar
 David Curtain   Victorian Bar
 Gerard D Dalton   Victorian Bar
 Richard P P Dalton   Victorian Bar
 Dr David H Denton    Victorian Bar
 Jeremy Gobbo  Victorian Bar
 Dr Richard J Manly   Victorian Bar
 Geoffrey G McArthur   Victorian Bar
 John Noonan   Victorian Bar
 James Peters   Victorian Bar
 Simon Marks   Victorian Bar
 Paul Santamaria   Victorian Bar
 Francis J J Tirnan   Victorian Bar
 Christopher J Townshend   Victorian Bar

Medicine and the sciences
 John Billings  (XC 1931–35)neurologist and expert in reproductive fertility
 Sir Edmund Britten Jones Rhodes Scholar and leading physician in Adelaide.
 Daniel Mahoney President of the Royal Society of Victoria (1939-1940), Director of the National Museum of Victoria.
 Professor Sir Peter Morris  (XC 1947–52)Nuffield Professor of Surgery at the University of Oxford; President of the Royal College of Surgeons of England (2001–2004)

Military and defence
 Colonel Geoffrey Brennan  (XC 1920–27) commanding officer of the Royal Military College, Duntroon; served in the British Army as a lieutenant colonel, landed in France on D-Day, mentioned in despatches, served in India, the North West Territories, the Middle East and Korea, Awarded the Croix de Guerre. 
 Lieutenant General Sir Thomas Daly Chief of the General Staff (1966–1971)
 Lieutenant-Commander Michael Parker  Naval officer & former private secretary to the Duke of Edinburgh (1947-1957)
Lieutenant Raymond John Paul Parer AFC - aviation pioneer. First single-engined flight from England to Australia.

Politics and public service

Vice-Regal

 Sir James Gobbo    (XC 1944–48)Governor of Victoria (1997–2000) and recipient of the Xaverian Award in 2012.
 Sir Michael O'Loghlen  (XC 1883)  4th Baronet O'Loghlen  Lord Lieutenant of County Clare (1910 – 1922)

Australian Federal Parliament

 Cornelius Ahern  MP for Indi (1913-1914)
 Richard Alston  (XC 1947–59) Minister for Communications (1996-2003), Victorian Senator (1986–2004); Australian High Commissioner to the United Kingdom (2005-2008), Federal President of Liberal Party  (2014-2017)
 Tim Fischer  (XC 1958–63)Deputy Prime Minister of Australia (1996–1999), Leader of the National Party (1990–1999), MP for Farrer (1984–2001); Australian Ambassador to the Holy See (2008-2012)
 Rob Hulls  (XC 1968–74) MP for Kennedy (1990-1993)
 Edward Jolley MP for Grampians (1914-1915)
 Pat Kennelly  Victorian Senator (1953-1971)
 Sir Phillip Lynch  (XC 1950–51)Treasurer of Australia (1975-1977); Deputy Liberal Party Leader (1972-1982); Privy Councillor; MP for Flinders (1966-1982)
 Julian McGauran National Senator for Victoria (1987-1990; 1993-2006), Liberal Senator for Victoria (2006-2011)
 Peter McGauran Minister for Science and Technology, MP for Gippsland (1983-2008)
 Arthur Rodgers (XC 1890)  Minister for Trade and Customs (1921-1923), MP for Wannon (1913-1922, 1925-1929)
 Thomas Ryan  (XC 1890) MP for West Sydney (1919–1921)
 Bill Shorten Leader of the Opposition and Australian Labor Party Leader (2013-2019), MP for Maribyrnong (since 2007)
 Dan Tehan Minister for Education (2018-2020), Minister for Trade (2020-2022), MP for Wannon (since 2010) 
 Tom Tehan Senator for Victoria (1975-1978)

Australian State and Territory Parliaments

 John Bennett  Tasmanian State MP for Denison (1986-1990), Attorney-General of Tasmania (1986-1989)
 Edward Connellan ,   Northern Territory MLC (appointed) (1955-1967)
 Leo Connellan   NSW State MLC ((1969-1981)
 John Cornwall  (XC 1951)  South Australian State MLC (1975-1989), Minister for Health and Community Services (1985-1988), Minister for Health (1982-1985), Minister for Environment and Lands (1979), MLC (1975-1988)
 Robin Cooper  Victorian State MP for Mornington (1985-2006), Minister for Transport (1997-1999)
 Luke Donnellan  Victorian State MP for Narre Warren North (2022-2022), Minister in Andrews' ministries (2014-2021)
 Julian DoyleVictorian State MP for Gisborne (1967 to 1971)
 Tim Fischer  (XC 1958–63) NSW State MP for Sturt (1971-1980) and Murray (1980-1984) 
 Michael Gidley Victorian State MP for Mount Waverley (2010–2018)
 Matthew Groom  Tasmanian State MP for Denison (2010–2018), Minister for Environment and Energy (2014-2017)
 Rob Hulls  (XC 1968–74)Deputy Premier of Victoria (2007-2010), Attorney-General of Victoria (1999-2010), Victorian State MP for Niddrie (1996-2012)
 Pat Kennelly  Minister in Cain's first and second ministries; Victorian MLC for Melbourne West (1932-1952)
 Brendan Lyons Tasmanian State MP for Bass (1982-1986), Minister for Housing (1984-1986).
 Kevin Lyons Deputy Premier of Tasmania (1969–1972), Speaker of the Tasmanian House of Assembly (1956-1959)
 Pat McNamara (XC 1957–68) Deputy Premier of Victoria (1992–1999), Victorian State MP for Benella (1982–2000) 
 Charles Murphy  Victorian State MP for Hawthorn (1952-1955)
 David O'Brien (XC 1985–88)  Victorian MLC for Western Victoria (2010-2014)
 Thomas Ryan  (XC 1890) Premier of Queensland (1915–1919)

UK Parliament (House of Lords)

 Lord (Lewis) Clifford (XC 1905), 12th Baron Clifford of Chudleigh, British hereditary peer. - Patron of the Victorian scouting movement. Donated "Yarra Brae", now Clifford Park Wonga Park to the Scouts. Brother of Sir Bede Clifford.

Public Service

 Philip Alston United Nations Special Rapporteur on extrajudicial, summary or arbitrary executions (2004–2010). UN Special Rapporteur on extreme poverty and human rights (since 2014). 
 George BrouwerVictorian Ombudsman
 Sir Francis Connolly Lord Mayor of Melbourne (1945-1948)
 Gerard Henderson Chief of Staff to John Howard (1984-1986) 
 Franz Schneider Private Secretary to Prime Minister Joseph Lyons (1938-1939), Secretary to The Australian Public Service Board.
 George Taylor Chief of Staff to Sir Frank Nelson KCMG, head of the Special Operations Executive.

Sport
 Robert de Castella ,  World Marathon Champion 1983, Commonwealth Games gold medallist, multiple Olympian & former marathon world record holder.
 Will Davisoncurrent V8 supercar driver and two-time Bathurst 1000 winner
 Paul Dumbrellcurrent V8 supercar driver and one-time Bathurst 1000 winner
 Zak Evanscricketer; Australia U19s, Melbourne Renegades, Victorian Men’s
 Leslie "Chuck" Fleetwood-Smithtest cricketer
 Dick Garrard Snr. OBE  – Olympic Wrestling Silver Medallist 1948 & 3 time Commonwealth Games Gold medallist
 Alan Jones  1980 Formula One world champion
 David McNeillAustralian representative to the 2012 Olympics in athletics
 Jonathan Merlocricketer; Australia U19s, Cricket Australia XI, Melbourne Stars
 Leo O'BrienAustralian Test cricketer; 1932-1936 
 Pat O'DeaUS college football Hall of Fame inductee 1962
 Tom O'Donnellcricketer
 Joseph Plant Australian Rules Footballer (Richmond) and Victorian First Class Cricketer
 Stuart KingAustralian Rules Footballer (St Kilda) and Victorian  Cricketer
 Ken Roche  Commonwealth Games 400m hurdles gold medalist 
 Percy Rodriguez - Australian rules footballer, killed in  action during the Battle of the Somme.
 Karl Schneiderformer Victorian first class cricketer
 Paul Trimboli former Socceroos player
 Andrew Gowers (footballer)
 James Morrissey (footballer)
Austin Robertson Sr. World champion professional sprinter (1930) VFL Footballer South Melbourne Football Club
Four Old Xaverians, Leslie "Chuck" Fleetwood-Smith, Leo O'Brien, Stuart King and Joe Plant represented Victoria v South Australia in a Sheffield Shield match at the MCG in February 1933.

International Rowing Representatives  
 Peter Antonie   Multiple Olympian, Olympic gold medallist 1992 and World Champion 1986
 Tom Daffy - World Championships M8+ 1966
 Marc Douez - World Champion M2+ 2005
 Brian Doyle - Olympic Bronze Medallist Rowing M8+ 1956
 David Doyle - Olympian M4- 1984
 Mark Doyle - Olympian M8+ and World Champion M8+ 1986
 Anthony Ellis - World Championships  - M4+ 1995
 David England - Olympian M8+ 1980, World Championships LM8+ 1977 & 1979
 Dick Garrard Jnr. Olympic rower M4- 1964 & World Championship Bronze Medal LM8+ 1977
 Peter Gillon - Olympian M4- 1960 & 1964
 Nick Green  - Member of the Oarsome Foursome; Dual Olympic gold medallist and 4 time World Champion
 Simon Keenan - Olympian 2020 M8+ & World silver medallist M8+ 2018
 Mike McKay  Member of the Oarsome Foursome; Dual Olympic gold medallist and 4 time World Champion
 Malcolm McKenzie - World Championships M8+ 1966
 Martin Tomanovits - Olympic Rower M8+ 1964
 Peter Tomanovits - World Championships M2- 1987

AFL
21st century players
 Andrew Leoncelli XC1992 – Melbourne Demons
 David Bourke XC1993 – Richmond Tigers, North Melbourne Kangaroos
 Andrew Schauble XC1994 – Collingwood Magpies, Sydney Swans
 Tim Fleming XC1996 – Richmond Tigers
 John Baird XC1998 – North Melbourne Kangaroos
 Matthew Ball XC1999 – Hawthorn Hawks
 Caydn Beetham XC1999 – St Kilda Saints
 Ted Richards XC2000 – Essendon Bombers, Sydney Swans
 James Davies XC2000 – Essendon Bombers
 Luke Ball XC2002 – St Kilda Saints, Collingwood Magpies
 Jobe Watson XC2002 – Essendon Bombers
 Cameron Hunter XC2002 – Melbourne Demons
 Marcus Allan XC2004 – Brisbane Lions
 Matthew Spangher XC2004 – West Coast Eagles, Sydney Swans, Hawthorn Hawks
 Josh Kennedy XC2006 – Hawthorn Hawks, Sydney Swans
 Robbie Tarrant XC2006 – North Melbourne Kangaroos, Richmond Tigers
 Casey Sibosado XC2008 – Fremantle Dockers
 Dan Hannebery XC2009 – Sydney Swans, St Kilda Saints
 Alex Johnson XC2009 – Sydney Swans
 Sam Shaw XC2009 – Adelaide Crows
 Patrick Ambrose XC2009 – Essendon Bombers
 Alex Browne XC2010 – Essendon Bombers
 Tim Golds XC2011 – GWS Giants, Collingwood Magpies 
 Xavier Richards XC2011 – Sydney Swans
 Daniel Robinson XC2012 – Sydney Swans
 Daniel Howe XC2013 – Hawthorn Hawks
 Marc Pittonet XC2014 – Hawthorn Hawks
 Jack Silvagni XC2015 – Carlton Blues
 Sean Darcy XC2016 – Fremantle Dockers
 Willie Rioli XC2013 – West Coast Eagles
 Billy Gowers XC2014 – Western Bulldogs
 Bailey Smith XC2018 – Western Bulldogs
 Changkuoth Jiath XC2017 – Hawthorn Hawks
 Laitham Vandermeer XC2017 – Western Bulldogs
 Finlay Macrae- XC2020- Collingwood Magpies
 Tex Wanganeen - XC2021 Essendon Bombers
In the 2013 AFL season, Ted Richards, Josh Kennedy, Dan Hannebery, Alex Johnson, Daniel Robinson, and Xavier Richards were all listed on the Sydney Swans playing list, holding the record for the most Old Xavierians at one AFL club.

The 2012 AFL season was a successful year for Old Xaverians as Ted Richards, Josh Kennedy, Dan Hannebery and Alex Johnson were all in the Swans premiership team, and Watson, Richards, and Kennedy were all selected in the All-Australian side.

See also
 List of schools in Victoria
 List of boarding schools
 Associated Public Schools of Victoria

References

External links
 Old Xaverians Association
 Xavier College website
 Old Xaverian Football Club website

Xavier College
Associated Public Schools of Victoria
Melbourne-related lists
 
 List